= Der Veker =

Jewish publication

Veker (or Der Veker, Yiddish דער וועקער, The Alarm Clock) is a Jewish journal in the Yiddish language featuring Jewish thought, commentary, essays, history, fiction, humor, and poetry. It has been referred to as "the New Yorker of the Hasidic Yiddish world". The journal is published several times a year. Veker publishes articles that touch on sensitive topics that wouldn't be covered by other Orthodox Yiddish publications. Despite its independent streak, Veker is an Orthodox Jewish publication, and its content adheres to what is acceptable under Orthodox beliefs. Although it is published by Hasidic Jews, and mainly for a Hasidic readership, Veker’s mission is to provide a platform to every Speaker of the Yiddish language.

== See also ==
- Kave Shtiebel
