= Kave Shtiebel =

Yiddish-language social media platform

Kave Shtiebel (Yiddish: קאווע שטיבל) was a Yiddish-language social media platform founded in February 2012 and became an important discussion forum for the Hasidic community in the 2010s. The name means "coffee room", in allusion to the side-room in a Hasidic Jewish prayer house, where men can take a break and chat casually over a cup of coffee. It was founded in response to what was seen as censorship of posts critical of Hasidic power structures in other forums. Kave Shtiebel users have published an offline magazine, Der Veker, sold on newsstands in Brooklyn and elsewhere.

In August 2024, the forum announced its permanent closure, marking the end of a prominent digital platform for open discussion and cultural expression within the Yiddish-speaking Hasidic community.
